Zorica (Cyrillic script: Зорица) is a feminine given name. Notable people with the name include:

Zorica Dimitrijević-Stošić, Serbian pianist, accompanist, Full Professor of Piano at the Faculty of Music in Belgrade
Zorica Ðurković (born 1957), former basketball player
Zorica Jevremović Munitić (born 1948), theatre and video director, playwright, choreographer
Zorica Pantic (born c. 1951), college administrator and professor of electrical engineering
Zorica Pavićević (born 1956), former Yugoslav handball player
Zorica Vojinović (born 1958), former Yugoslav/Serbian handball player
Zorica (princess)

Slavic feminine given names
Serbian feminine given names